Metropolitan Symeon (also romanized Simeon; born Volodymyr Ivanovych Shostatsky, Володимир Іванович Шостацький)  is a bishop of the Orthodox Church of Ukraine and a member of its Holy Synod. He was born on November 3, 1962 in the village of Raykivtsi in the Khmelnytsky district of the Khmelnytsky region in Ukraine Together with Metropolitan  of Pereyaslav-Khmelnytsky, he joined the Orthodox Church of Ukraine. He had previously been a member of the Ukrainian Orthodox Church (Moscow Patriarchate), where  in 1996, he was consecrated as the Metropolitan Bishop of Vinnytsia and Bar.

Life
Volodymyr Ivanovych Shostatsky was born to a peasant family on November 3, 1962 in the village of Raykivtsi in the Khmelnytsky district of the Khmelnytsky region.

In 1980 he graduated from high school and served in the army until 1982. From 1983 to 1987 he studied at the Vinnytsia Medical Institute, and from 1987 to 1991 at the Moscow Theological Seminary.

In the UOC (MP)

On December 6, 1990, in the Moscow Danilov Monastery, he became a monk named Symeon (Russian pronunciation: Simeon) in honor of Simeon Stylites. On January 14, 1991, he was ordained to the rank of hierodeacon, on April 28 he was omade hieromonk. From 1990 to 1994 he was a caretaker at the Patriarchal Residence in the Moscow Danilov Monastery.

In 1994 he became a sacrist in the Kiev Pechersk Lavra and entered the Kiev Theological Academy. On April 7, 1995, he was ordained to the rank of igumen (abbot), on November 23 of the same year he was made archimandrite.

On May 4, 1996, he was ordained bishop of Volodymyr-Volynskyi and Kovel, head of the newly formed Volodymyr-Volynskyi diocese.

On May 10, 2002, he was promoted to the rank of archbishop. On July 9, 2011, he was promoted to the rank of metropolitan.

Metropolitan Symeon was the only one out of 83 members of the Council of UOC (MP) (November 13, 2018, Kiev Pechersk Lavra), who did not sign the resolution for breaking the communion between UOC (MP) and Ecumenical Patriarchate of Constantinople.

In the Orthodox Church of Ukraine

On December 15, 2018, he participated in the Unity Council and the creation of a local autocephalous Orthodox Church of Ukraine. He was one of the candidates for the position of primate, but in the elections lost to the metropolitan of the former UOC-KP Epifaniy, taking second place according to the results of voting. He received 28 votes against 36 for Epifaniy, that means he has a support inside UOC-KP and UAOC, because there were only 2 bishops from MP who participated in voting.

Together with the former primates of UOC-KP Filaret (Denysenko) and UAOC Macariy (Maletych) he became a lifelong member of the Holy Synod of the newly formed church.

After joining OCU in December he predicted slow but large-scale move of MP clergy to the newly formed church. He said about MP clergy position in case of joining OCU:

As of January 24, 2019,  "more than 30" MP parishes joined the diocese of metropolitan Symeon of Vynnytsa and Bar, Ukraine in OCU.

References

External links
Historic unification of Ukrainian Orthodox Church by Tadeusz A. Olszański // Center of Eastern Studies. December 17, 2018.
In Vinnytsia Region Another 2 Parishes Had Joined OCU (in Ukrainian) // Religious Information Service of Ukraine. January 24, 2019.
Metropolitan Symeon Biography (in Ukrainian) at official UOC-MP site. Retrieved July 6, 2018.
Metropolitan Symeon Predicts Large-Scale Move of Clergy to OCU // Religious Information Service of Ukraine. December 24, 2018.
Metropolitan Symeon was the only one who did not accept a resolution of the Council of UOC (MP) (in Russian) // LB.ua. November 13, 2018.

Bishops of the Orthodox Church of Ukraine
Bishops of the Russian Orthodox Church
Ukrainian Orthodox metropolitan bishops
1962 births
Living people
People from Khmelnytskyi Oblast
Recipients of the Order of Prince Yaroslav the Wise, 4th class